The Turn is the ninth studio album by American rock band Live, released on October 28, 2014. It is their only release with lead singer Chris Shinn and is their final album with guitarist Chad Taylor, bassist Patrick Dahlheimer, and drummer Chad Gracey who were all fired from the band in 2022.

History
The band announced that they would be taking a two-year hiatus in June 2009, but in November, guitarist Chad Taylor revealed that lead singer Ed Kowalczyk had left the band. Kowalczyk (who has since rejoined Live) released a solo album Alive in June 2010, while the remaining three members of Live formed a new band, The Gracious Few, with singer Kevin Martin and guitarist Sean Hennesy, both of Candlebox. Their self-titled album was released in September 2010.

On March 12, 2012 Chris Shinn, former lead singer of the band Unified Theory, was revealed to have joined Live when he played with them at a show at the Strand-Capitol Performing Arts Center in York. Live's first major tour with Shinn was as part of the Summerland Tour 2013, playing 35 shows across the US.

The first single from The Turn, "The Way Around Is Through" was released on September 16, 2014. Live have also released full versions of the tracks "Siren's Call", "We Open the Door", "Natural Born Killers" and "Don't Run to Wait" via YouTube, each with an introduction by Chad Taylor.

The music on The Turn is jointly credited to all four members of Live, however none of the three remaining original band members receives a lyric writing credit. Shinn is credited as lyricist on all songs, with producer Jerry Harrison receiving a co-writing credit on seven tracks, his daughter Aishlin on three and songwriter Bruce Wallace on five.

Track listing

Personnel
Live
Chris Shinn – vocals, rhythm guitar
Chad Taylor – lead guitar
Patrick Dahlheimer – bass
Chad Gracey – drums

Additional personnel
Dana Alexandra  – backing vocals
Aishlin Harrison  – backing vocals
Jerry Harrison – production
Alexander LeFever – backing vocals

Charts

Album

Singles

References

External links

Official website

2014 albums
Live (band) albums
Albums produced by Jerry Harrison